Photoalignment is a technique for orienting liquid crystals to desired alignment by exposure to polarized light and a photo reactive alignment chemical. It is usually performed by exposing the alignment chemical ('command surface') to polarized light with desired orientation which then aligns the liquid crystal cells or domains to the exposed orientation. The advantages of photoalignment technique over conventional methods are non-contact high quality alignment, reversible alignment and micro-patterning of liquid crystal phases.

History 
Photoalignment was first demonstrated in 1988 by K. Ichimura on Quartz substrates with an azobenzene compound acting as the command surface. Shortly after publication of Ichimura’s results, the groups from the USA (Gibbons et al.), Russia/Switzerland (Schadt et al.  and Ukraine (Dyadyusha et al.) almost simultaneously demonstrated LC photoalignment in an azimuthal plane of the aligning substrate. The latter results have been particularly important because they provided a real alternative to the rubbing technology. Since then several chemical combinations have been demonstrated for photoalignment and applied in production of liquid crystal devices like modern displays.

Advantages 
Traditionally, liquid crystals are aligned by rubbing electrodes on polymer covered glass substrates. Rubbing techniques are widely used in mass production of liquid crystal displays and small laboratories as well. Due to the mechanical contact during rubbing, often debris are formed resulting in impurities and damaged products. Also, static charge is generated by rubbing which can damage sensitive and increasingly miniature electronics in displays.

Many of these problems can be addressed by photoalignment.

 Photoalignment is by definition a non-contact process. This allows alignment of liquid crystals even in mechanically inaccessible areas. This has immense implications in use of liquid crystals in telecommunications and organic electronics.
 By optical imaging, very small domains can be aligned which results in extremely high quality alignments.
 By varying the orientation of liquid crystal alignment on a microscopic scale, thin film optical devices can be created like lens, polarizer, optical vortex generator, etc.

References 

Liquid crystals
Optical materials
Cleanroom technology